The Parliament of the Republic of Moldova is the supreme representative body of the Republic of Moldova, the only state legislative authority, being a unicameral structure composed of 101 elected MPs on lists, for a period of 4 years. Parliament is elected by universal vote, equal directly, secret and freely expressed. The president of the Parliament of the Republic of Moldova is elected by the Parliament, with a minimum of 52 votes.

The Constitutional Court of the Republic of Moldova, on a proposal of the Central Electoral Commission, decides to validate or invalidate the mandate of the Member of Parliament. The mandate is invalid in the case of violation of electoral legislation. The Parliament is meeting at the convening of the Speaker of the Parliament within 30 days of the elections. Parliament's mandate is prolonged until the legal meeting of the new composition. During this period the Constitution cannot be amended and organic laws cannot be adopted, amended or abrogated.

Parliamentary elections took place on 11 July 2021. The snap parliamentary elections resulted in a landslide win for Party of Action and Solidarity (PAS).

Apparatus
The Parliament staff ensures an organizational, informational and technological assistance to activity of the Parliament, the Standing Bureau, standing committees, parliamentary factions and of deputies. The structure and the personal record of the parliament staff are approved by the Parliament.

Legislative procedure
According to the Constitution of Moldova (1994), the Parliament is the supreme representative organ and the single legislative authority of the state. The right of legislative initiative belongs to the Members of Parliament, to the Speaker (excepting proposals to revise the Constitution) and to the Government. In exercise of this right MPs and the president of the state present to Parliament draft papers and legislative proposals, while the Government presents draft papers.

Parliamentary factions
In order to form the working bodies and to organize the activity of the parliament, deputies form parliamentary factions composed of at least 5 deputies elected on the basis of lists of electoral contestants, as well as parliamentary factions with the same numerical composition as independent deputies. The parliamentary factions are constituted within 10 days after the legal constitution of the parliament.

11th Moldovan Parliament
The 101 deputies elected on 11 July 2021 at the 2021 Moldovan parliamentary election constitute 3 main parliamentary factions as follows:

Election results

Structure of former legislatures

Moldovan Parliament 1994–1998

Moldovan Parliament 1998–2001

Moldovan Parliament 2001–2005

Moldovan Parliament 2005–2009

Moldovan Parliament April–July 2009

Moldovan Parliament 2009–2010

Moldovan Parliament 2010–2014

Moldovan Parliament 2014–2019

Moldovan Parliament 2019–2021

Moldovan Parliament 2021–present

Parliamentary committees

 Committee for Agriculture and Food Industry
 Alexandru Trubca (PAS) – Deputy Chair
 Radu Mudreac (BCS) – Deputy Chair
 Iurie Păsat (PAS) – Secretary
 Gheorghe Agheorghiesei (PAS)
 Viorel Barda (PAS)
 Gheorghe Ichim (PAS)
 Corneliu Furculiță (BCS)
 Committee for Culture, Education, Research, Youth, Sport and Mass-media
 Liliana Nicolaescu-Onofrei (PAS) – Chair
 Virgiliu Pîslariuc (PAS) – Deputy Chair
 Adela Răileanu (BCS) – Deputy Chair
 Marcela Adam (PAS) – Secretary
 Maria Gonța (PAS)
 Marcela Nistor (PAS)
 Larisa Novac (PAS)
 Eugeniu Sinchevici (PAS)
 Elena Beleacova (BCS)
 Diana Caraman (BCS)
 Adrian Lebedinschi (BCS)
 Petru Jardan (ȘOR)
 Committee for Economy, Budget and Finance
 Dumitru Alaiba (PAS) – Chair
 Radu Marian (PAS) – Deputy Chair
 Petru Burduja (BCS) – Deputy Chair
 Valentina Manic (PAS) – Secretary
 Iulia Dascălu (PAS)
 Sergiu Lazarencu (PAS)
 Vasile Șoimaru (PAS)
 Inga Sibova (BCS)
 Oleg Reidman (BCS)
 Vadim Fotescu (ȘOR)
 Committee for Environment and Regional Development
 Ina Coșeru (PAS) – Deputy Chair
 Ion Babici (PAS) – Secretary
 Mariana Cușnir (PAS)
 Dorel Iurcu (PAS)
 Vitalie Gavrouc (PAS)
 Alla Pilipețcaia (BCS)
 Eduard Smirnov (BCS)
 Committee for Human Rights and Interethnic Relations
 Grigore Novac (BCS) – Chair
 Natalia Davidovici (PAS) – Deputy Chair
 Angela Munteanu-Pojoga (PAS) – Secretary
 Liliana Grosu (PAS)
 Marina Morozova (PAS)
 Evghenia Cojocari (PAS)
 Nicolai Rusol (BCS)
 Committee for National Security, Defense and Public Order
 Lilian Carp (PAS) – Chair
 Ana Racu (PAS) – Deputy Chair
 Constantin Starîș (BCS) – Secretary
 Andrian Cheptonar (PAS)
 Boris Marcoci (PAS)
 Oazu Nantoi (PAS)
 Ion Șpac (PAS)
 Fiodor Gagauz (BCS)
 Chiril Tatarlî (BCS)
 Committee for Public Administration 
 Larisa Voloh (PAS) – Chair
 Petru Frunze (PAS) – Deputy Chair
 Valeriu Muduc (BCS) – Secretary
 Efimia Bandalac (PAS)
 Vitalie Jacot (PAS)
 Ersilia Qatrawi (PAS)
 Ivanna Koksal (BCS)
 Irina Lozovan (BCS)
 Marina Tauber (ȘOR)
 Committee for Social Protection, Health and Family
 Dan Perciun (PAS) – Chair
 Adrian Belîi (PAS) – Deputy Chair
 Vladimir Odnostalco (BCS) – Deputy Chair
 Regina Apostolova (ȘOR) – Deputy Chair
 Maria Pancu (PAS) – Secretary
 Dorian Istrati (PAS)
 Ana Oglinda (PAS)
 Alla Darovannaia (BCS)
 Veaceslav Nigai (BCS)
 Committee for Foreign Policy and European Integration
 Doina Gherman (PAS) – Chair
 Ion Groza (PAS) – Deputy Chair
 Bogdan Țirdea (BCS) – Deputy Chair
 Adrian Băluțel (PAS) – Secretary
 Mihail Druță (PAS)
 Mihai Popșoi (PAS)
 Galina Sajin (PAS)
 Vlad Batrîncea (BCS)
 Vladimir Voronin (BCS)
 Judicial Committee for Appointments and Immunities
 Olesea Stamate (PAS) – Chair
 Veronica Roșca (PAS) – Deputy Chair
 Vasile Bolea (BCS) – Deputy Chair
 Igor Chiriac (PAS) – Secretary
 Vasile Grădinaru (PAS)
 Artemie Cătănoi (PAS)
 Ana Calinici (PAS)
 Boris Popa (PAS)
 Alla Dolință (BCS)
 Alexandr Suhodolschi (BCS)
 Denis Ulanov (ȘOR)
 Committee for Public Finance Control
 Tatiana Cunețchi (BCS) – Chair
 Artur Mija (PAS) – Deputy Chair
 Oleg Canațui (PAS) – Secretary
 Victor Spînu (PAS)
 Zinaida Greceanîi (BCS)
 Ilan Shor (SOR)

Permanent Bureau
 Igor Grosu – President (PAS)
 Mihai Popșoi – Vice President (PAS)
 Vlad Batrîncea – Vice President (BCS)
 Olesea Stamate – PAS
 Liliana Nicolaescu-Onofrei – PAS 
 Doina Gherman – PAS 
 Veronica Roșca – PAS 
 Dan Perciun – PAS
 Corneliu Furculiță – BCS
 Vasile Bolea – BCS
 Constantin Starîș – BCS
 Denis Ulanov – ȘOR

Presidents of the Parliament of Moldova 

 Alexandru Moșanu (September 4, 1990 – February 2, 1993)
 Petru Lucinschi (February 4, 1993 – January 9, 1997)
 Dumitru Moțpan (March 5, 1997 – April 23, 1998)
 Dumitru Diacov (April 23, 1998 – March 20, 2001)
 Eugenia Ostapciuc (March 20, 2001 – March 24, 2005)
 Marian Lupu  (March 24, 2005 – May 5, 2009)
 Vladimir Voronin (May 12, 2009 – August 28, 2009)
 Mihai Ghimpu (August 28, 2009 – December 28, 2010)
 Marian Lupu (December 30, 2010 – April 25, 2013)
 Liliana Palihovici (acting; April 25, 2013 – May 30, 2013)
 Igor Corman (May 30, 2013 – January 23, 2015)
 Andrian Candu (January 23, 2015 – February 24, 2019)
 Zinaida Greceanîi (June 8, 2019 – April 28, 2021)
 Igor Grosu (July 29, 2021 – present)

Parliament Building 

The Parliament Building was formerly the meeting place of the Central Committee of the Moldovan branch of the Communist Party of the Soviet Union, and was built between 1976 and 1979. It is located on Stephen the Great Boulevard formerly known as Lenin Boulevard. The architects were Alexander Cerdanțev and Grigore Bosenco. The building was damaged during civil unrest in 2009 and repairs were carried out in 2012 and 2013. The Parliament moved back into the restored building in February 2014.

Sources

External links
Official page
Parliamentary Elections in the Republic of Moldova

 
Moldova
Moldova
Moldova
1990 establishments in the Moldavian Soviet Socialist Republic